In the Battle of Groenkop (Battle of Tweefontein) on 25 December 1901, Head Commandant Christiaan de Wet's Boer commando surprised and defeated a force of Imperial Yeomanry under the command of Major Williams.

Background 
By late 1901, de Wet's guerilla force based itself near the settlements of Lindley, Bethlehem and Reitz in the northeast part of the Orange Free State. On 28 November, de Wet called a krijgsraad (war council) of the still-active Boer leaders near Reitz. They determined to strike back at their British tormentors, who numbered 20,000 men.

As part of Lord Kitchener's strategy, the British constructed lines of blockhouses and barbed wire across the veld. The blockhouse lines were designed to restrict the movements of the Boer guerillas so they could be trapped by British mobile columns. To protect the construction, Major General Sir Leslie Rundle deployed four dispersed forces.

Battle 
De Wet carefully scouted the Groenkop position for three days. He noted that the British posted their sentries atop the sheer west side of the kop, instead of at the bottom where they could give timely warning of an attack. The Boer leader determined to scale the west side using the trace of a gully.

At 2:00 am on Christmas morning, de Wet's commando clambered up the steep slope in single file with their boots removed so as to minimise any noise. The surprise was nearly total. Challenged by a single sentry when they were over halfway to the top with a few scattered shots, the Boers, who were ordered into battle by de Wet shouting "Stormt Burgers" swarmed up and over the crest. They began firing downhill into the British tents, inflicting a "massacre." Savage fighting lasted about 40 minutes before the British gave up.

Aftermath 
The next morning, one of the 206 British prisoners of the Boers noted that his foes were so short of clothing that some wore women's attire. The 250 unwounded British prisoners of war were stripped literally naked before they were turned loose the next day. Kitchener wrote, "It is very sad and depressing that the boers are able to strike such blows, but I fear ... we shall always be liable to something of the sort from the unchecked rush of desperate men at night."

By 5 February 1902, Kitchener's blockhouse lines were completed and he sent 9,000 men on a massive sweep through the countryside. In this first operation, 285 Boers were captured but de Wet and President Marthinus Steyn and their men escaped the trap. The second drive lasted from 16 February to 28. Again, de Wet got away, but this time he had to abandon most of his cattle. On 27 February, Colonel Henry Rawlinson's column encircled and captured a 650-man Boer commando at Lang Reit, a few miles from Tweefontein. This brought the British "bag" in the successful sweep to 778 surrendered Boers. The third drive by Major Elliott's division, from 4 March to 11 March, was a failure, with only about 100 Boers captured. Worse, de Wet escaped to join Fighting General Koos de la Rey in the Western Transvaal.

References

Bibliography 
 Evans, Martin Marix. The Boer War: South Africa 1899-1902. Oxford: Osprey, 1999. 
 Pakenham, Thomas. The Boer War. New York: Avon Books, 1979. 

Battles of the Second Boer War
1901 in South Africa
December 1901 events
Conflicts in 1901